Samuel Stanton (born 19 April 1994) is a Scottish footballer who plays as a midfielder for Scottish Championship club Raith Rovers. He has also previously played for Hibernian, with loan spells at each of Cowdenbeath, Livingston & Dumbarton, before moving to Dundee United, Phoenix Rising and Dundalk as well as representing Scotland at youth international level.

Early life
Stanton attended Broughton Primary and Trinity Academy, Edinburgh. Stanton shares his surname with a famous former Hibs player, Pat Stanton, however he is not related to him.

Career

Hibernian
Stanton was a member of the Hibernian under-19 squad. He was promoted to the first team on 28 December 2011 when he was an unused substitute for the match against Inverness CT. He went on to make his first team debut aged 17 as a substitute against Rangers on 28 January 2012.

He signed a three-year contract with Hibs in September 2012. Stanton was loaned to Cowdenbeath in January 2013 and made his debut in a 1–1 draw against Morton. His stint at Cowdenbeath ended after just two appearances, however, as he suffered a knee injury that required surgery.

Stanton established himself in the Hibs first team during the second half of the 2013–14 season. He won the SPFL young player of the month award for February 2014. In April 2014, Stanton signed a four-year contract extension with Hibs.

On 8 January 2016, Stanton signed for Livingston for the remainder of the 2015–16 Scottish Championship season.

Stanton joined Scottish Championship side Dumbarton on a season-long loan on deadline day in August 2016. He scored his first goals for the club in a 2–2 draw with Ayr United in February 2017

Dundee United
Stanton joined Championship team Dundee United in July 2017, initially on loan. The move was made permanent on 19 January 2018, with Stanton signing a two-and-a-half-year contract with United.

Phoenix Rising
Stanton signed with Phoenix Rising on 23 January 2020. After a successful season winning the Western Conference and reaching the USL Championship Final (which was cancelled due to the COVID-19 pandemic), Stanton and the club mutually agreed to part ways in December.

Dundalk
He signed for League of Ireland Premier Division side Dundalk in January 2021. Stanton made his debut in the 2021 President of Ireland's Cup on 12 March 2021, as his side beat Shamrock Rovers on penalties to lift the trophy. He featured in all 6 of the clubs UEFA Europa Conference League qualifiers as they were narrowly knocked out 4–3 on aggregate by Vitesse Arnhem in the Third Qualifying Round. He scored his first goal for the club on 27 September in a 2–1 win over Bohemians. Stanton made a total of 40 appearances for the club in all competitions as they finished in 6th place in the league.

Raith Rovers
On 15 December it was announced that Stanton had returned to Scotland to sign for Scottish Championship side Raith Rovers on a 2 and a half year contract that would commence on 1 January 2022.

International
Stanton was selected for the Scotland national under-19 football team in August 2012. He appeared as a substitute in a 1–0 defeat against Germany. He then scored the winning goal in a 2–1 victory against Norway. On 5 March 2014, he made his debut for the Scotland under-21 side in a 2–2 draw against Hungary at Tannadice.

Career statistics

Honours
 Raith Rovers
Scottish Challenge Cup : 2021-22

References

External links
Scotland stats at Scottish FA

1994 births
Living people
Footballers from Edinburgh
Scottish footballers
Association football midfielders
Hibernian F.C. players
Cowdenbeath F.C. players
Phoenix Rising FC players
People educated at Trinity Academy, Edinburgh
Scotland youth international footballers
Scottish Premier League players
Scottish Football League players
Scottish Professional Football League players
USL Championship players
Scotland under-21 international footballers
Livingston F.C. players
Dumbarton F.C. players
Dundee United F.C. players
Scottish expatriate footballers
Scottish expatriate sportspeople in the United States
Expatriate soccer players in the United States
League of Ireland players
Expatriate association footballers in the Republic of Ireland
Dundalk F.C. players
Raith Rovers F.C. players